Sayyadi Abubakar Mahmoud Usman CON (born 1928) is a Fulani from the Sullubawa Clan and the first Emir of Ringim, Jigawa State, Nigeria. He is the eldest surviving member of the  Dabo Fulani Dynasty. His father, Mahmoud Usman is the son of the 9th Emir of Kano Usman Abdullahi Maje Karofi. After the death of his father, Sayyadi was appointed as the district head of Ringim with the title of Danmajen Kano. A year later, he was appointed as Tafidan Kano by the 13th Emir of Kano Ado Bayero. Following the excide of Jigawa State from Kano State by Idris Garba in 1991, Ringim emirate was created and Sayyadi was elevated from district head to the first fulani Emir of Ringim from Sullubawa clan

References

1928 births
Living people
Nigerian Fula people
Nigerian Muslims
Nigerian traditional rulers